Mr. Drums: Buddy Rich & His Band Live on King Street, San Francisco is a 1985 recording made by jazz drummer Buddy Rich and his Big Band.  It is the final album released during Rich's lifetime.

Release history 
A three-LP and two-CD audio album was initially released by Cafe Records (a division of Mobile Fidelity Sound Lab), and a video of the "Channel One" set was released by Pioneer Video (LaserDisc) and Sony (videocassette).  The Channel One set was eventually re-issued on DVD as were the remaining tracks (the West Side Story set aka "The Lost Tapes").

Track listing

3 LP release
Disc 1, side A:
 "Machine" (Reddie) – 3:14
 "Best Coast" (LaBarbera) – 3:57
 "One O'Clock Jump" (Basie) – 7:49
 "Sophisticated Lady" (Ellington, Mills) – 5:17
Disc 1, side B:
 "Norwegian Wood (This Bird Has Flown)" (Lennon, McCartney) – 3:15
 "Love for Sale" (Porter) – 4:05
 "No Exit" (Cunliffe) – 6:44
Disc 2, side A:
 "Mexicali Nose" (Betts) – 2:58
 "Willowcrest" (Bob Florence) – 4:21
 "'Round Midnight" (Hanighen, Monk, Williams) – 5:34
 "Cotton Tail" – (Ellington) – 4:59
Disc 2, side B:
 "New Blues" (Piestrup) – 7:28
 "Tee Bag" (Mainieri) – 6:10
 "The Red Snapper" (Shew) – 4:50
Disc 3, side A:
 "Channel One Suite" (Reddie) – 16:14
Disc 3, side B:
 "West Side Story" (Overture and Medley) (Bernstein, Sondheim) – 15:31

2 CD release
Disc 1 (The "Channel One Suite" set)
 "Machine" (Reddie) – 3:14
 "Best Coast" (LaBarbera) – 3:57
 "One O' Clock Jump" (Basie) – 7:49
 "Sophisticated Lady" (Ellington, Mills) – 5:17
 "Norwegian Wood" (Lennon, McCartney) – 3:15
 "Love For Sale" (Porter) – 4:05
 "No Exit" (Cunliffe) – 6:44
 "Channel One Suite" (Reddie) – 16:14
Disc 2 (The "West Side Story" set) 
 "Mexicali Nose" (Betts) – 2:58
 "Willowcrest" (Florence) – 4:21
 "'Round Midnight" (Hanighen, Monk, Williams) – 5:34
 "Cotton Tail" – (Ellington) – 4:59
 "New Blues" (Piestrup) – 7:28
 "Tee Bag" (Mainieri) – 6:10
 "The Red Snapper" (Shew) – 4:50
 "West Side Story" (Overture and Medley) (Bernstein, Sondheim) – 15:31

Video releases 
 Mr. Drums: Buddy Rich and His Band Live on King Street, The Channel One Set aka ...The Channel One Suite
(musical number contents same as Disc 1 of the CD release)
 Buddy Rich and His Band: The Lost West Side Story Tapes aka ...The Lost Tapes
(musical number contents same as Disc 2 of the CD release)

Personnel 
 Buddy Rich – drums
 Dave Carpenter – bass guitar
 Bill Cunliffe – piano
 Steve Marcus – tenor saxophone, soprano saxophone
 Brian Sjoerdinga – tenor saxophone, flute
 Bob Bowlby – alto saxophone, flute
 Mark Pinto – alto saxophone, flute
 Jay Craig – baritone saxophone
 Paul Phillips –  trumpet, flugelhorn
 Joe Kaminski – trumpet, flugelhorn
 Michael Lewis – trumpet, flugelhorn
 Eric Miyashiro – trumpet, flugelhorn
 Scott Bliege – trombone
 Michael Davis – trombone
 Jim Martin – trombone

References 

 CAFE 3-732 (3 LP release)
 Allmusic.com (album review)
 Allmusic.com (Channel One set video)
 Allmusic.com (The Lost Tapes video review)

1986 live albums
Buddy Rich live albums
Concert films